Digitivalva pappella is a moth of the family Acrolepiidae. It is found in Spain and on the Canary Islands.

The larvae feed on Allagopappus dichotomus. They mine the leaves of their host plant. The mine has the form of a full depth blotch. Pupation takes place outside of the mine in a reticulate cocoon.

References

Acrolepiidae
Moths described in 1908